Minor Move is an album by American hard bop tenor Tina Brooks. It features performances by Brooks, Lee Morgan, Sonny Clark, Doug Watkins and Art Blakey. It was recorded on March 16, 1958, and was the first album Brooks recorded as a leader for the Blue Note label. The album, however, remained unreleased until being issued in Japan in 1980 (Blue Note GXF 3072). In 2000, Minor Move was released on CD. The composition "Nutville" (not to be confused with the fast-paced Latin composition of the same name by Horace Silver) is sometimes credited to Lee Morgan, but as producer Michael Cuscuna explains in the liner notes to the 2000 release: "Lee brought the tune to the session, but never claimed credit for it. Curtis Fuller also confirms that it was indeed a Tina Brooks original."

Track listing

"Nutville" (Brooks) - 8:52
"The Way You Look Tonight" (Jerome Kern, Dorothy Fields) - 10:41
"Star Eyes" (Gene De Paul, Don Raye)- 8:15
"Minor Move" (Brooks) - 6:40
"Everything Happens to Me" (Matt Dennis, Tom Adair) - 6:10
"Minor Move" [Alternate Take] - 6:53 Bonus track on CD reissue

Personnel
Tina Brooks - tenor saxophone
Lee Morgan - trumpet
Sonny Clark - piano
Doug Watkins - bass
Art Blakey - drums

References 

1980 albums
Tina Brooks albums
Blue Note Records albums
Albums produced by Alfred Lion
Albums recorded at Van Gelder Studio